Yevgeni Nikolayevich Zaytsev (born 24 February 1971) is a Russian professional football official and a former player.

External links
  Career profile at Footballfacts

1971 births
People from Starodub
Living people
Soviet footballers
Russian footballers
Association football defenders
Russian expatriate footballers
Expatriate footballers in Belarus
Expatriate footballers in Poland
Russian Premier League players
FC Dynamo Bryansk players
FC Rechitsa-2014 players
FC SKA Rostov-on-Don players
FC Lada-Tolyatti players
Sportspeople from Bryansk Oblast